Viola Center was an unincorporated community in Audubon County, Iowa, in the United States.

History

A post office was established in Viola Center on March 6, 1878, and remained in operation until it was discontinued on March 21, 1903. In 1887, Viola Center's population was estimated at 50.

The Viola Center Episcopal Methodist Church was built in 1887; prior to the building's construction, the congregation gathered locally. The church was home to many community gatherings, including an annual Christmas Tree program; in 1920, the Christmas Tree gathering at the church was "packed to its utmost capacity", according to the newspaper report in nearby Audubon.

In 1900, Viola Center had a store, the church, and the post office. A school was located one mile to the north, and another school, the Morland schoolhouse, one mile south of Viola Center. The church was still present in 1930. The Viola Center High School opened in December 1906. Attendance was estimated at 15-20 students. The high school closed in the 1950s, and was demolished in 2020. 

The Coon Rapids and Viola Center Telephone Company operated in Viola Center in the early 1920s, and at that time comprised 11.25 miles of telephone line.

Viola Center's population was 52 in 1915, and 69 in 1925. Today, Viola Center is nearly empty, and is sometimes considered a ghost town.

The Viola Center Cemetery is located more than a mile north of the townsite, at 41°49'25'N 094°48'07'W.

References

Unincorporated communities in Audubon County, Iowa
1881 establishments in Iowa
Unincorporated communities in Iowa